was a town located in Yamato District, Fukuoka Prefecture, Japan.

As of 2003, the town had an estimated population of 5,522 and a density of 209.33 persons per km². The total area was 26.38 km².

On January 29, 2007, Yamakawa, along with the town of Setaka (also from Yamato District), and the town of Takata (from Miike District), was merged to create the city of Miyama.

External links
Miyama official website  (some English content)

Dissolved municipalities of Fukuoka Prefecture
Populated places disestablished in 2007